Syed Hasan Askari (born 10 April 1901 in Khujwa, British India) was an Indian historian. His literary work was recognized by the Indian government and focused on medieval Sufism, the regional history of Bihar, and aspects of cultural history of medieval India. He authored, edited and translated more than 250 articles, research papers, forewords, prefaces, and book reviews, which have been awarded by the Indian government and published in multiple journals, books and proceedings.

Recognition 
Askari awarded the title of "Khan Saheb" by the British Indian Government in 1945.

Askari was presented the Ghalib Award in 1974 by his Excellency Fakhruhddin Ali Ahmad, the then President of India.

Neelam Sanjeeva Reddy presented  the President's Certificate of Honor to Askari, in 1978.

Gyani Zail Singh, awarded Padma Shri to Askari in 1985.

Academic honors 
In 1967, Magadh University, Bihar, conferred upon Askari the degree of D. Litt (honoris causa)

In 1984, Patna University, Bihar, conferred upon Askari the degree of D. Litt (honoris causa).

References 

1901 births
1990 deaths
Recipients of the Padma Shri
20th-century Indian historians
20th-century Indian male writers
Recipients of Ghalib Award